The Help is a 2011 American drama directed by Tate Taylor. Featuring an ensemble cast, the film is about a young white woman, Eugenia "Skeeter" Phelan (Emma Stone), and her relationship with two black maids, Aibileen Clark (Viola Davis) and Minny Jackson (Octavia Spencer) during the Civil Rights Movement in the United States. The film is an adaptation of Kathryn Stockett's 2009 novel of the same name. The Help was produced by DreamWorks Studios and distributed by Disney's Touchstone Pictures label.

Awards and nominations
The film was nominated for over 102 awards and won 41 of those awards.

References

External links
 

Accolades
Lists of accolades by film
Disney-related lists